An autonomous administrative division (also referred to as an autonomous area, entity, unit, region, subdivision, or territory) is a subnational administrative division or internal territory of a sovereign state that has a degree of autonomy—self-governance—under the national government. Autonomous areas are distinct from the constituent units of a federation (e.g. a state, or province) in that they possess unique powers for their given circumstances. Typically, it is either geographically distinct from the rest of the state or populated by a national minority. Decentralization of self-governing powers and functions to such divisions is a way for a national government to try to increase democratic participation or administrative efficiency or to defuse internal conflicts. States that include autonomous areas may be federacies, federations, or confederations. Autonomous areas can be divided into territorial autonomies, subregional territorial autonomies, and local autonomies.

List of major autonomous areas

Other territories considered autonomous

British Crown Dependencies 

Guernsey, the Isle of Man, and Jersey are self-governing Crown Dependencies which are not part of the United Kingdom; however, the UK is responsible for their defence and international affairs.

British Overseas Territories 

Gibraltar is a self-governing overseas territory of the UK. Most of the other 13 British Overseas Territories also have autonomy in internal affairs through local legislatures.

Dutch constituent countries 

Aruba, Curaçao, and Sint Maarten are autonomous countries within the Kingdom of the Netherlands, each with their own parliament. In addition they enjoy autonomy in taxation matters as well as having their own currencies.

French overseas collectivities, New Caledonia, and Corsica 

The French Constitution recognises three autonomous jurisdictions. Corsica, a region of France, enjoys a greater degree of autonomy on matters such as tax and education compared to mainland regions. New Caledonia, a sui generis collectivity, and French Polynesia, an overseas collectivity, are highly autonomous territories with their own government, legislature, currency, and constitution. They do not, however, have legislative powers for policy areas relating to law and order, defense, border control or university education. Other smaller overseas collectivities have a lesser degree of autonomy through local legislatures. The five overseas regions, French Guiana, Guadeloupe, Martinique, Mayotte, and Réunion, are generally governed the same as mainland regions; however, they enjoy some additional powers, including certain legislative powers for devolved areas.

New Zealand overseas territories 

New Zealand maintains nominal sovereignty over three Pacific Island nations. The Cook Islands and Niue are self-governing countries in free association with New Zealand that maintain some international relationships in their own name. Tokelau remains an autonomous dependency of New Zealand. The Chatham Islands—despite having the designation of Territory—is an integral part of the country, situated within the New Zealand archipelago. The territory's council is not autonomous and has broadly the same powers as other local councils, although notably it can also charge levies on goods entering or leaving the islands.

Ethnic autonomous territories

Ethiopian special woredas
In Ethiopia, "special woredas" are a subgroup of woredas (districts) that are organized around the traditional homelands of specific ethnic minorities, and are outside the usual hierarchy of a kilil, or region. These woredas have many similarities to autonomous areas in other countries.

Areas designated for indigenous peoples

Other areas that are autonomous in nature but not in name are areas designated for indigenous peoples, such as those of the Americas:

 Aboriginal (First Nation or Native American or Indian) Indian reserve and Indian reservation, in, respectively, Canada and the United States.
 the five comarcas indígenas ("indigenous regions") of Panama.

List of historical autonomous administrative divisions

 Autonomous region of Catalonia within the Spanish Republic (1932-1939)
 Autonomous Silesian Voivodeship
 Autonomous Region in Muslim Mindanao in the Philippines (1989–2019)
 Autonomous Republic of Northern Epirus in Albania (1914).
 Autonomous republics of the Soviet Union (1922–1990)
 Bantustans in South West Africa (1968-1990) and South Africa (1956-1994)
 Carpathian Ruthenia and Slovakia within Czechoslovakia (1938–1939).
 Grand Duchy of Finland of the Russian Empire.
 Magyar Autonomous Region of Socialist Republic of Romania (1952–1968)
 Southern Ireland (1921–22) within the United Kingdom of Great Britain and Ireland.
 Southern Sudan Autonomous Region (1972–1983) and Southern Sudan Autonomous Region (2005–2011)

See also
 Devolution
 List of autonomous areas by country
 Autonomous administrative divisions of the People's Republic of China
 Autonomous administrative divisions of India
 Autonomous administrative divisions of Russia
 Autonomous administrative divisions of Spain
 List of countries and inhabited areas
 List of autonomous regions leaders
 Personal union
 Region (administrative)
 Regional state
 Imperial immediacy
 Dependent territory
 Vassal state
 Protectorate

References

Works cited
 M. Weller and S. Wolff (eds), Autonomy, Self-governance and Conflict Resolution: Innovative Approaches to Institutional Design in Divided Societies. Abingdon, Routledge, 2005
 From Conflict to Autonomy in Nicaragua: Lessons Learnt, report by Minority Rights Group International
 P.M. Olausson, Autonomy and Islands, A Global Study of the Factors that determine Island Autonomy.  Åbo: Åbo Akademi University Press, 2007.
 Thomas Benedikter (ed.), Solving Ethnic Conflict through Self-Government - A Short Guide to Autonomy in Europe and South Asia, EURAC Bozen 2009, 
 Thomas Benedikter, 100 Years of Modern Territorial Autonomy - Autonomy around the World, Berlin/Zürich, LIT 2021,  (pb)
 Thomas Benedikter, The World's Modern Autonomy Systems, EURAC Bozen 2010; https://www.academia.edu/44170136/The_Worlds_Modern_Autonomy_Systems

 
Autonomy
Decentralization